There was no defending champions for this year, as the previous final between Tomás Carbonell and Diego Pérez against Paul Haarhuis and Mark Koevermans was cancelled due to rain.

Pérez did not compete this year. Carbonell teamed up with Carlos Costa and lost in first round to tournament winners Sergio Casal and Emilio Sánchez.

Haarhuis and Koevermans reached the final again, but lost to Casal and Sánchez 7–5, 7–5.

Seeds

Draw

Draw

References

External links
 Official results archive (ATP)
 Official results archive (ITF)

Dutch Open (tennis)
Dutch Open
1990 Dutch Open (tennis)